Dean Arthur Harens (June 30, 1920 – May 20, 1996) was an American actor.  He appeared in movies, plays and many TV programs over four decades.

Early years 
Born in South Bend, Indiana in 1920, Harens studied at the Goodman Theatre in Chicago. Harens was a protege of actress Alison Skipworth, who discovered him when he was acting in Michigan.

Career 
Harens acted summer stock before debuting on Broadway in The Talley Method in 1941. His first film appearance came at the age of 24, in 1944's Christmas Holiday.  He appeared in seven movies throughout his career, although never in a starring role.  He was a cast member on three TV series, and played a recurring character on the ABC series The F.B.I.. He also made four guest appearances on Perry Mason, including the role of murderer Frank Fettridge in the 1959 episode, "The Case of the Calendar Girl," the 1959 episode of “The Case of Paul Drake’s Dilemma” as the brother-in-law of the victim, and in 1960 the role of double murderer Riley Morgan in "The Case of the Wandering Widow."  Harens also guest starred twice in the western TV series Bonanza: he played Jim Poole in the 1965 episode "Jonah" and he portrayed rancher Morgan Tanner in the 1966 episode "Credit for a Kill".

Harens's wife, actress June Dayton, whom he met while acting on Broadway in 1947, died in 1994 at the age of 70.

Death 
Harens died in Van Nuys, in the San Fernando Valley of Los Angeles, California, at the age of 75. He was interred in San Fernando Mission Cemetery in San Fernando, California.

Filmography

References

External links

 
 
 

1920 births
1996 deaths
American male stage actors
American male film actors
American male television actors
20th-century American male actors